7385 Aktsynovia, provisional designation , is a background asteroid from the inner regions of the asteroid belt, approximately between 4 and 9 kilometers in diameter, depending on its assumed spectral type. It was discovered on 22 October 1981, by Soviet–Russian astronomer Nikolai Chernykh at the Crimean Astrophysical Observatory in Nauchnyj on the Crimean peninsula.

Orbit and classification 

Aktsynovia is a non-family asteroid from the main belt's background population. It orbits the Sun in the inner asteroid belt at a distance of 2.1–2.7 AU once every 3 years and 8 months (1,349 days). Its orbit has an eccentricity of 0.13 and an inclination of 4° with respect to the ecliptic. No precovery was ever taken for this asteroid.

Naming 

This minor planet was named in memory of Russian artist couple Lyudmila and Arkadij Aktsynov (both 1910–1997), who were masters in landscape painting and portrait painting. Their landscape art depicted the regions of Siberia, Baikal, Sayany, Altaj and Volga. The official naming citation was published by the Minor Planet Center on 24 January 2000.

Physical characteristics

Diameter and albedo 

According to the survey carried out by NASA's spaced-based Wide-field Infrared Survey Explorer and its subsequent NEOWISE mission, Aktsynovia measures 8.9 and 8.6 kilometers in diameter, respectively, with a corresponding albedo of 0.06 and 0.07. However, rather than classifying the body as a C-type asteroid, the Collaborative Asteroid Lightcurve Link assumes a standard albedo for stony asteroids of 0.20 and calculates a much smaller diameter of 4.0 kilometers with an absolute magnitude of 14.37.

Rotation period 

A rotational lightcurve of Aktsynovia was obtained from photometric observations made at the U.S. Palomar Transient Factory in December 2011. The lightcurve gave a rotation period of  hours with a brightness amplitude of 0.32 in magnitude.

References

External links 
 Asteroid Lightcurve Database (LCDB), query form (info )
 Dictionary of Minor Planet Names, Google books
 Asteroids and comets rotation curves, CdR – Observatoire de Genève, Raoul Behrend
 Discovery Circumstances: Numbered Minor Planets (5001)-(10000) – Minor Planet Center
 
 

007385
Discoveries by Nikolai Chernykh
Named minor planets
19811022